Al-Gassaniyya was an Andalusian adība (woman of letters) and poet from Bayyāna, present-day Pechina, Almería, Spain.

Few details remain in the historic record about this Arab poet; her surname, the last remnant of her identity, indicates she belonged to the Gassān clan and was from Bayyāna. This would have made her a contemporary of Zaynab al-Mariyya, another Almerian woman poet.

She is known for writing panegyrics dedicated to the kings.

Only six lines written by al-Gassaniyya have survived: part of a romantic prelude to a likely much longer qasida about Jairán, the king of Almeria, that emulates the work of the famous court poet Ibn Darraj al-Qastalli:

Did it sadden you to hear them say:
"The palanquins of the women have departed"?
How could you bear it, woe is you,
when they left? 
There are but only deaths on their departure,
and if not, a resignation.

References 

People from Almería
11th-century Spanish women
10th-century Spanish women
11th-century Spanish poets
Spanish women poets
Women poets from al-Andalus